Seberang Jaya (Jawi: سبرڠ جاي) is a suburb in the city of Seberang Perai, Penang, Malaysia. Located at the southern bank of the Perai River and east of Perai proper, the area was developed in the 1970s. Since then, Seberang Jaya has evolved into a booming area, with various commercial and retail developments.

History 
The township of Seberang Jaya was built in 1970 by the Penang Development Corporation (PDC), in tandem with the establishment of the Perai Industrial Estate. The construction of the new township was aimed at providing a housing area adjacent to the newly built industries in Perai, and erasing social and economic inequalities between the urban and rural inhabitants.

Transportation 
Two major highways cut through the heart of Seberang Jaya – the North–South Expressway and the Butterworth–Kulim Expressway. Both expressways intersect at the former's Interchange 163 within the centre of the township.

Rapid Penang's buses 703 and 709 connect the township with Butterworth and Bukit Mertajam. These are complemented by Rapid Penang's Congestion Alleviation Transport (CAT), a free-of-charge transit service within Seberang Jaya. In addition, Rapid Penang also operates Bridge Express Shuttle Transit (BEST) bus services towards Bayan Lepas on Penang Island, catering mainly to industrial workers, as well as an interstate bus service to the town of Sungai Petani in the neighbouring state of Kedah.

Education 
Seberang Jaya contains two primary schools, two high schools and a private tertiary institution.

Primary schools
 SRK Seberang Jaya
 SRK Seberang Jaya 2
High schools
 SMK Tun Hussein Onn
 SMK Seberang Jaya
Private college
 Open University Malaysia
Aside from these, Seberang Jaya is home to the Penang State Library, the main public library of the State of Penang.

Health care 

The Seberang Jaya Hospital, administered by Malaysia's Ministry of Health, is one of the six public hospitals scattered throughout the State of Penang. It also serves as the main hospital within the entire municipality of Seberang Perai. The 393-bed hospital offers various specialist treatments and procedures, such as general surgery, nephrology and obstetrics. An ongoing upgrade of the hospital, slated for completion by 2021, is expected to increase its capacity by 316 beds.

Shopping 

Sunway Carnival Mall, the sole shopping mall in Seberang Jaya, was opened in 2007 and is the flagship shopping centre of Sunway Group within the State of Penang. Its main anchor tenants include Parkson and Golden Screen Cinemas. The Sam's Groceria closed down during MCO and being replaced by Noko variety store. The mall also contains the Sunway Carnival Convention Centre, a major venue for meetings, incentives, conferences and exhibitions (MICE).

Tourist attractions 

The Penang Bird Park, founded in 1988 (Opened on 26 November), was Malaysia's first aviary. It contains more than 300 species of birds, including sea eagles, flamingoes and hornbills.

See also 
 Central Seberang Perai District

References 

Central Seberang Perai District
Neighbourhoods in Penang